The Space Foundation is an American nonprofit organization whose mission is to advocate for all sectors of the global space industry through space awareness activities, educational programs, and major industry events. It was founded in 1983.

Locations 
Located in Colorado Springs, Colorado, the Space Foundation's headquarters houses Space Foundation team offices, the Ackerman Conference Center and the Space Foundation Discovery Center. The Space Foundation also has an office in Washington, D.C., and representatives in Texas and Florida.

Education 
The Space Foundation delivers K-12 student programs in laboratory, classroom and after-school settings. Programs include STEM, social studies, history, the arts and literature and are available to individual classes, school districts, public and private school, colleges and universities offering education curriculum and homeschool organizations.

Discovery Center 
The Space Foundation Discovery Center is a space, science, and technology attraction housed in the Space Foundation Headquarters.

Space Symposium 
The Space Foundation hosts the annual Space Symposium in Colorado Springs at The Broadmoor Hotel. The Space Symposium features presentations and panels that provide insight into space developments and the latest on critical industry issues. Each year, several awards are presented at the Space Symposium recognizing achievements in various space arenas.

The symposium includes an annual fundraiser called "Yuri's Night", named in honour of Russian cosmonaut Yuri Gagarin. In 2022, the foundation renamed the fundraiser as "A Celebration of Space: Discover What’s Next" due to the invasion of Ukraine by Russia.

Awards

General James E. Hill Lifetime Space Achievement Award 
The General James E. Hill Lifetime Space Achievement Award is the highest honor bestowed by the Space Foundation, presented annually at a special luncheon held during the Space Symposium. The award recognizes outstanding individuals who have distinguished themselves through lifetime contributions to the welfare or betterment of humankind through the exploration, development and use of space, or the use of space technology, information, themes or resources in academic, cultural, industrial or other pursuits of broad benefit to humanity. Nominations are solicited throughout the global space industry and the honoree is selected by the Space Foundation's Board of Directors. Recipients of the General James E. Hill Lifetime Space Achievement Award include:

Alan Shepard Technology in Education Award 
The Space Foundation, in conjunction with the Astronauts Memorial Foundation (AMF) and the National Aeronautics and Space Administration (NASA), annually presents the Alan Shepard Technology in Education Award to recognize outstanding contributions to creative and innovative use of technology in education by K-12 educators or district-level education personnel. Winners of the Alan Shepard Technology in Education Award include:

Douglas S. Morrow Public Outreach Award 
The Space Foundation annually presents the Douglas S. Morrow Public Outreach Award in memory of Douglas S. Morrow, renowned Academy Award-winning writer and producer, space advocate and former Space Foundation Board Member, to an individual or organization who has made significant contributions to the public awareness and understanding of space programs. Winners of the Douglas S. Morrow Public Outreach Award include:

Space Achievement Award 
The Space Foundation's Space Achievement Award recognizes individuals or organizations for space achievement, a breakthrough space technology or program or other achievements representing critical milestones in the evolution of space exploration and development. Winners of the Space Achievement Award include:

John L. Jack, Swigert Jr., Award for Space Exploration 
The John L. "Jack" Swigert Jr., Award for Space Exploration recognizes extraordinary accomplishments by a company, space agency or consortium of organizations in the realm of space exploration and discovery. The award is in memory of astronaut John L. 'Jack' Swigert Jr., one of the inspirations for creating the Space Foundation. Winners of the John L. Jack Swigert Jr., Award for Space Exploration include:

Space Technology Hall of Fame 
The Space Technology Hall of Fame was created in 1988 by the Space Foundation with cooperation from NASA and is administered by the Space Foundation. The foundation annually honors groups and individuals that, according to the organization, "transform technology originally developed for space exploration into products that help improve the quality of life here on Earth".

Since 1988, it has been inducting dozens of technologies and honoring hundreds of organizations and individuals that transform technology originally developed for space exploration into products that help improve the quality of life on Earth.

References

External links 
 Space Foundation - Home page

Organizations established in 1983
Non-profit organizations based in Colorado
Space organizations
Alan Shepard
Jack Swigert